Luka Rupnik (born 20 May 1993) is a Slovenian professional basketball player for San Pablo Burgos of the Spanish LEB Oro and the Slovenian national basketball team.

Professional career
After spending four seasons in Slovenian powerhouse Union Olimpija, in Summer 2016 he moved to Actel Força Lleida of the Spanish second division. On 1 November 2016, after averaging 15 points and 6.8 assists in the first six games of the season, he agreed a three-year contract with Liga ACB and EuroCup team Montakit Fuenlabrada.

On 10 September 2019, Rupnik signed one-year contract with Belgian vice-champion Antwerp Giants. Rupnik averaged 10 points, 3.2 rebounds and 5 assists per game in the Belgian league and BCL. On 25 July 2020, he signed with Nymburk of the Czech NBL.

On 16 October 2020, he signed with Casademont Zaragoza of the Liga ACB.

On 6 December 2020, Rupnik signed with Cedevita Olimpija of the Slovenian League. Rupnik averaged 5.3 points and 4.3 assists per game.

On 9 December 2021, Rupnik signed with Semt77 Yalovaspor of the Turkish Basketball Super League (BSL). He averaged 11.7 points, 3.9 rebounds, league-high 8.1 assists and 1.3 steals per game.

On 7 November 2022, Rupnik signed with for San Pablo Burgos of the Spanish LEB Oro until the end of the 2022–23 season.

International career
Rupnik debuted for Slovenia at the EuroBasket 2011. He also represented Slovenia at the EuroBasket 2015 where they were eliminated by Latvia in the round of 16.

References

External links
 Luka Rupnik at abaliga.com
 Luka Rupnik at eurobasket.com
 Luka Rupnik at fibaeurope.com
Luka Rupnik at realgm.com

1993 births
Living people
ABA League players
Antwerp Giants players
Baloncesto Fuenlabrada players
Basket Zaragoza players
Basketball Nymburk players
Basketball players at the 2020 Summer Olympics
Força Lleida CE players
KK Cedevita Olimpija players
KK Olimpija players
Liga ACB players
Olympic basketball players of Slovenia
People from Idrija
Point guards
Slovenian expatriate basketball people in Spain
Slovenian expatriate basketball people in the Czech Republic
Slovenian expatriate basketball people in Turkey
Slovenian expatriate sportspeople in Belgium
Slovenian men's basketball players
Yalovaspor BK players